UGC 4904 is a barred spiral galaxy in the constellation Lynx, located about 77 million light-years from Earth. On October 20, 2004, a supernova impostor was observed by Japanese amateur astronomer Koichi Itagaki within the galaxy. This same star may have transitioned from a LBV star to a Wolf–Rayet star shortly before it was observed as blowing up as hypernova SN 2006jc on October 11, 2006.

References

External links 
 UGC 4904 in a SIMBAD
 UGC 4904 in NASA's Extragalactic Database

Barred spiral galaxies
Lynx (constellation)
04904
26231